Matthew Restall (born 1964) is a historian of Colonial Latin America. He is an ethnohistorian, a Mayanist, a scholar of the conquest, colonization, and the African diaspora in the Americas, and an historian of popular music. Restall has areas of specialization in Yucatán and Mexico, Guatemala, and Belize. He is a member of the New Philology school of colonial Mexican history and the founder of a related school, the New Conquest History. He is currently Edwin Erle Sparks Professor of Latin American History and Anthropology, and Director of Latin American Studies, at the Pennsylvania State University. He is a former president of the American Society for Ethnohistory (2017–18), a former editor of Ethnohistory journal (2007–17), a former senior editor of the Hispanic American Historical Review (2017–22), editor of the book series Latin American Originals, and co-editor of the Cambridge Latin American Studies book series. He also writes books on the history of popular music.

Biography
Restall was born in a suburb of London, England, in 1964. He grew up in England, Denmark, Spain, Venezuela, Japan, and Hong Kong. But he was schooled in England from the age of 8, spending ten boarding-school years first at Marsh Court in Hampshire and then at Wellington College, before going on to receive a BA degree, First Class with Honors, in Modern History from Oxford University in 1986. He earned an MA in 1989 and a PhD in Latin American History from UCLA in 1992, studying under James Lockhart, and then held teaching positions at universities in Texas and Boston before taking up a tenured post at Penn State. After 9/11 he became a joint US/British citizen. In 2020, Restall was the Richard Greenleaf Distinguished Chair of Latin American Studies at Tulane University. He is a member of the Board of Governors of the John Carter Brown Library, Brown University.

Since 1995, Restall has published 30 books in seven languages, as well as 80 articles and essays. He appears regularly on TV documentaries, radio shows, and podcasts, discussing the Aztecs and Mayas, Columbus and the Spanish conquistadors, and the history of rock and pop music. His best-known book is Seven Myths of the Spanish Conquest (2003), which has also been published in Spanish, Portuguese and Italian. In 2003, Seven Myths of the Spanish Conquest was listed as one of the twelve Best History Books of the year by The Economist. An Updated Edition of Seven Myths of the Spanish Conquest was published in 2021, with an edition in Chinese coming in 2023. His other books include The Maya World: Yucatec Culture and Society, 1550-1850 (1997), Maya Conquistador (1998), Invading Guatemala (with Florine Asselbergs, 2007), 2012 and the End of the World: The Western Roots of the Maya Apocalypse (with Amara Solari, 2011), Latin America in Colonial Times (with Kris Lane, 2011; 2nd edition, 2018), and The Conquistadors (with Felipe Fernández-Armesto, 2012).  His book The Black Middle: Africans, Mayas, and Spaniards in Colonial Yucatan won the Conference on Latin American History's 2009 prize for best book on Mexican history. His recent book, When Montezuma met Cortés (HarperCollins, January 2018) won the 2019 Conference on Latin American History's Howard F. Cline Memorial Prize for best book or article "judged to make the most significant contribution to the history of Indians in Latin America." His newest books are Return to Ixil (with Mark Christensen), The Maya (with Amara Solari), and his first book on popular music, Blue Moves. He is currently writing books on post-pop, on Elton John, on Christopher Columbus, and on early Belize (tentatively titled The Caye).

He has won fellowships from the National Endowment for the Humanities, the John Simon Guggenheim Foundation, the Institute for Advanced Study at Princeton, the John Carter Brown Library, the Library of Congress, and the Capitol Historical Society.

His father is the ornithologist Robin Restall, his sister is the neo-druid author Emma Restall Orr, and his spouse is the art historian Amara Solari.

Bibliography of Books
Entre Mayas y Españoles: Africanos en el Yucatán Colonial. Mexico City: Fondo de Cultura Económica. (2020)
The Maya: A Very Short Introduction (with Amara Solari). Oxford: Oxford University Press (2020)
Blue Moves. New York: Bloomsbury, 33 1/3 series. (2020)
Return to Ixil: Maya Society in an Eighteenth-Century Yucatec Town (with Mark Christensen). Boulder: University Press of Colorado. (2019)
Cuando Montezumo conoció a Cortés. Mexico City: Taurus. Spanish edition of When Montezuma Met Cortés. (2019)
When Montezuma Met Cortés: The True Story of the Meeting that Changed History. New York: Ecco/HarperCollins. (2018)
Latin America in Colonial Times (with Kris Lane). Cambridge: Cambridge University Press. 2nd edition of 2011 book. (2018)
I Sette Miti Della Conquista Spagnola. Palermo: 21 Editore. Italian edition of Seven Myths. (2017)
Конкуридаторите. Sofia: Ashur. Bulgarian edition of The Conquistadors. (2017)
Conquista de Buenas Palabras y de Guerra: una visión indígena de la conquista (with Michel Oudijk). Mexico City: UNAM. Revised edition of La Conquista Indígena. (2014)
Los Conquistadores (with Felipe Fernández-Armesto).  Madrid: Alianza Editorial. Spanish edition of The Conquistadors. (2013)
The Conquistadors: A Very Short Introduction (with Felipe Fernández-Armesto). Oxford: Oxford University Press. (2012)
Latin America in Colonial Times (with Kris Lane). Cambridge: Cambridge University Press. (2011)
The Riddle of Latin America (with Kris Lane). Boston: Cengage. (2011)
2012 and the End of the World: The Western Roots of the Maya Apocalypse (with Amara Solari). Lanham: Rowman & Littlefield. (2011)
The Black Middle: Africans, Mayas, and Spaniards in Colonial Yucatán. Stanford: Stanford University Press. (2009)
Black Mexico: Race and Society from Colonial to Modern Times (editor, with Ben Vinson III). Diálogos series. Albuquerque: University of New Mexico Press. (2009)
La Conquista Indígena de Mesoamérica: El caso de Don Gonzalo Mazatzin Moctezuma (with Michel Oudijk). Puebla, Mexico: Secretaría de Cultura del Gobierno del Estado de Puebla. (2008)
Invading Guatemala: Spanish, Nahua, and Maya Accounts of the Conquest Wars (with Florine Asselbergs). Latin American Originals #2.  University Park: Penn State University Press. (2007)
Sete mitos da conquista espanhola. Rio de Janeiro: Civilização Brasileira.  Portuguese edition of Seven Myths. (2006)
Mesoamerican Voices: Native-Language Writings from Central Mexico, Oaxaca, Yucatán, and Guatemala (with Lisa Sousa and Kevin Terraciano). Cambridge: Cambridge University Press. (2005)
Beyond Black and Red: African-Native Relations in Colonial Latin America (editor). Diálogos series. Albuquerque: University of New Mexico Press. (2005)
Los siete mitos de la conquista española.  Barcelona: Paidós (Paidós Orígenes #46).  Spanish edition of Seven Myths. (2005)
Seven Myths of the Spanish Conquest.  New York: Oxford University Press. (2003)
Maya Survivalism (editor, with Ueli Hostettler). Markt Schwaben, Germany: Verlag Anton Saurwein (Acta Mesoamericana No. 12). (2001)
Maya Conquistador.  Boston: Beacon Press.  (1998)
Dead Giveaways: Indigenous Testaments of Colonial Mesoamerica and the Andes  (editor, with Susan Kellogg).  Salt Lake City: University of Utah Press. (1998)
The Maya World: Yucatec Culture and Society, 1550–1850. Stanford: Stanford University Press.  (1997)
Life and Death in a Maya Community: The Ixil Testaments of the 1760s.  Lancaster, CA: Labyrinthos. (1995)

References

External links
 Matthew Restall, Faculty webpage at Penn. State U.
 Amazon.com, Restall books available on Amazon.
 Academia.edu, Complete list of Restall's published books, articles, and essays. 
 Latin American Originals, Pennsylvania State University Press
 Cambridge Latin American Studies, Cambridge University Press
 Ethnohistory Quarterly, American Society for Ethnohistory
 
 

1964 births
Living people
Aztec scholars
Mayanists
Historians of Mesoamerica
American Mesoamericanists
20th-century Mesoamericanists
21st-century Mesoamericanists
Pennsylvania State University faculty